Ondo Town is the second largest town in Ondo State, Nigeria. Ondo Town is the trade center for the surrounding region. Yams, cassava, grain and tobacco are grown. Cotton is also grown, and is used to weave cloth called Aso Oke fabric which is widely accepted by the indigenes as the local attaire . Ondo Town is the largest producer of cocoa products in the region.

The title of the king of the town, who reigns as a direct descendant of the fabled Emperor Oduduwa, is "Osemawe". Osamawe title originated from an unusual situation as reported by Nigerian Punch that when the favoured wife of the first Monarch had a set of twins, the king was embarrassed because it was then an abomination. He was so bewildered by the birth of the twins that he exclaimed, ‘Ese omo re’ (meaning these children are an abomination). It is said that this exclamation has through linguistic evolution changed into ‘Osemawe’, which is the title of the monarch of Ondo today.   The present reigning monarch is Dr. Adesimbo Victor Kiladejo, who was crowned in September 2006 following the death of the former king, Dr. Festus Ibidapo Adesanoye.

Education institutions 
 Ondo State University of Medical Sciences is a university of medical sciences owned by the Ondo State Government, established in 2015. It is the third specialized university in Africa, and Nigeria's first specialized medical university to be accredited by the National Universities Commission.
 National Institute for Educational Planning and Administration, NIEPA Ondo was established in 1992 by the Federal Ministry of Education, in collaboration with UNESCO/IIEP Paris, as a sub-regional staff college for West Africa. It seek to realize its mission through capacity building, continuous training , consulting, action research in educational planning, information dissemination and providing resource centre services.
 Wesley University is a private university owned by the Methodist Church of Nigeria.
 Adeyemi College of Education is a federal government higher education institution located in Ondo Town, Ondo State, Nigeria. It is a degree-awarding institution  affiliated to Obafemi Awolowo University, and is ranked as the best college of education.
Ondo City Polytechnic is a privately funded and managed polytechnic located in Ondo Town , Ondo state, Nigeria.
The polytechnic was founded in 2017
 John Bosco Institute of Technology, Ondo City
 Adeyemi College of Education, Demonstration Secondary School.
Homaj international secondary school. Ondo Boys' High School, founded in 1919, is one of Africa's 50 oldest schools. These are a few out of over two hundred public and private schools in the Town.

Notable people
 Brigadier Samuel Ademulegun, first Brigadier of the Nigerian Army. He was killed in the 1966 Nigerian coup d'état. His statue stands at the Ife Roundabout, overlooking Brigadier Ademulegun Road, named after him, in Ondo Town
King Sunny Adé, also known as King of Juju music; Nigerian musician, singer-songwriter, multi-instrumentalist, and a pioneer of modern world music; been classed as one of the most influential musicians of all time
 Adewale Akinnuoye-Agbaje (born 1967), British actor and former fashion model; born in Islington, London to Nigerian parents of Yoruba, Ondo Town origin; he is fluent in several languages including Yoruba, Italian, and Swahili
 Chinwe Chukwuogo-Roy MBE (born 1952), royal portrait painter; born in Ondo Town; in 2001 she painted the official portrait of Queen Elizabeth II for her Golden Jubilee
 Mo Abudu, Nigerian media mogul, media personality, philanthropist, and former human resources management consultant.
 Omotola Jalade Ekeinde, actress, singer, philanthropist and former model of Ondo Town descent from Lagos; since her Nollywood film debut in 1995, she was honoured in Time magazine's list of the 100 most influential people in the world alongside Michelle Obama, Beyoncé and Kate Middleton
 Frederick Fasehun (born 1938), medical doctor, hotel owner, and leader of the Oodua Peoples Congress (OPC); born in Ondo Town
 Gani Fawehinmi, SAN, activist and philanthropist
 Olu Maintain, born Olumide Edwards Adegbulu; rose to prominence in 2007 with the release of the hit song "Yahooze" from his debut studio album Yahooze, the song won the Nigeria Entertainment Award in 2008 for Hottest Single of the Year; in 2008, he performed "Yahooze" at the Royal Albert Hall, London and brought on stage Colin Powell, the former United States Secretary of State
 Olusegun Mimiko, former Governor of Ondo State; former Nigerian minister of housing and urban development
 Godfrey Oboabona (born 1990), international footballer, as a defender; born in Ondo
 Ifedayo Oladapo, OON, NNOM (1932-2010), academic and professor of civil engineering at the University of Lagos
 Archbishop Timothy Olufosoye (–1992) was the first African Primate of the Church of Nigeria
 Wale (born 1984), American rapper of Maybach Music Group; born Olubowale Victor Akintimehin in Northwest, Washington, D.C.; his parents are of the Yoruba Ondo Town ethnic group of south-western Nigeria and came to the US from Austria in 1979
Bimbo Oshin, Nollywood thespian
Yemi Blaq, Nollywood actor
Teniola Apata, musician
Niniola, musician

References

External links
  
  
 

Populated places in Ondo State
Cities in Yorubaland
Cities in Nigeria